Zebrina detrita  is a medium-sized species of air-breathing land snail, a terrestrial pulmonate gastropod mollusc in the family Enidae.

Description

The width of the shell is 12 mm. The height of the shell is 25 mm.

Distribution
The distribution of this species is Central European and Southern European.
 Czech Republic - endangered (EN) in Bohemia, critically endangered (CR) in Moravia
 Bulgaria
 Hungary
 Slovakia
 Ukraine
 Israel
 Italy

Habitat
This species lives in relatively dry areas.

References

External links

 https://www.biolib.cz/en/taxon/id2715

Enidae
Gastropods described in 1774
Taxa named by Otto Friedrich Müller